No. 313 Squadron RAF was a Czechoslovak-manned fighter squadron of the Royal Air Force in the Second World War.

History
The squadron was formed at RAF Catterick on 10 May 1941. It was the last RAF squadron to be formed mostly of escaped Czechoslovak pilots. Its first commander was the British Squadron Leader Gordon Sinclair. On 29 July, Czechoslovak fighter pilot Josef Jaške was appointed as joint commander of the squadron. The plan was for responsibility to be transferred gradually from Sinclair to Jaške.

The squadron was equipped initially with Supermarine Spitfire I fighters. On 30 June 1941 it moved to RAF Leconfield in the East Riding of Yorkshire. In August the squadron was re-equipped with the Spitfire IIA, and on 25 August it moved to RAF Portreath in Cornwall. In October the squadron was re-equipped with the Spitfire VB/C.

On 15 December 1941 Sqn Ldr Karel Mrázek succeeded Jaške as commanding officer and the squadron moved to RAF Hornchurch in Essex. On 8 June 1942 the squadron moved to RAF Church Stanton in Somerset and on 26 June Sqn Ldr Jaroslav Himr succeeded Mrázek as commanding officer.

In 1943 the squadron moved to Scotland, firstly on 28 June to RAF Sumburgh "A" in Shetland, and shortly thereafter to RAF Peterhead "B" in Aberdeenshire. The squadron briefly flew the Spitfire VI in June and July 1943. On 20 July it moved to RAF Hawkinge in Kent. On 18 September it moved to RAF Ibsley in Hampshire and on 24 September Sqn Ldr František Fajtl succeeded Himr as commanding officer.

On 1 February 1944 Sqn Ldr Václav Bergman succeeded Fajtl as commanding officer. Also in February the squadron was re-equipped with the Spitfire IX. This model was fitted with 190-gallon "slipper" tanks to extend its range, enabling the squadron to escort bombers on raids deep into Germany. On 20 February the squadron moved to RAF Mendlesham in Suffolk. On 14 March it moved again, to RAF Rochford in Essex.

On 3 April 1944 the squadron moved to RAF Appledram in West Sussex. On 22 May Sqn Ldr Alois Hochmál succeeded Bergman as commanding officer. From 29 June the squadron spent a few days at RAF Tangmere, also in West Sussex. On 4 July it spent a week at RAF Lympne in Kent.

On 11 July 1944 the squadron moved to RAF Skeabrae on Orkney in Scotland. The squadron briefly flew the Spitfire VII in July and August 1944.

On 3 October 1944 the squadron moved to RAF North Weald in Essex. Also in October it reverted to the Spitfire IX, which it continued to operate until the end of its history as an RAF unit. On 1 September 1944 Sqn Ldr Karel Kasal succeeded Hochmál as commanding officer, and on 15 November Sqn Ldr Otmar Kučera succeeded Kasal. On 29 December the squadron moved to RAF Bradwell Bay, also in Essex.

From 27 February to 8 May 1945 the squadron was based at RAF Manston in Kent.  On 3 August members of all of the RAF's Czechoslovak squadrons held a farewell parade at RAF Manston. Air Marshal John Slessor inspected the parade, accompanied by A/M Karel Janoušek. On 24 August 313 Squadron moved to Ruzyně Airport in Prague. It became a squadron of the new Czechoslovak Air Force, and on 15 February 1946 was officially disbanded as an RAF squadron.

Aircraft operated

References

Notes

Bibliography

External links

 – movement and equipment history

313
Military units and formations disestablished in 1946
Military units and formations established in 1941
313 Squadron